The Motor Vehicles Act is an Act of the Parliament of India which regulates all aspects of road transport vehicles. The Act provides in detail the legislative provisions regarding licensing of drivers/conductors, registration of motor vehicles, control of motor vehicles through permits, special provisions relating to state transport undertakings, traffic regulation, insurance, liability, offences and penalties, etc. For exercising the legislative provisions of the Act, the Government of India made the Central Motor Vehicles Rules 1989.

Purpose
The main reasons behind drafting and enacting this legislation include the rapidly increasing number of vehicles in the country and the need for encouraging adoption of higher technology in the automotive sector. There also existed a need for effectively tracking down traffic offenders and providing more deterrent punishment for certain offences. There was also a growing concern for the framing of standards around vehicle components and road safety, as well as measures for pollution control. Additionally, there was a necessity for improved regulation around the registration of drivers, with there being a need for stricter protocol around granting driving licences. The system of vehicular registration also merited change, with an updated system being brought in place for registration marks, as well as for the maintenance of State registers for driving licenses and vehicle registration. The Act was also brought in to liberalise the grant of permits for vehicles carrying goods, as well as to rationalise definitions for types of vehicles.

History and Amendments

Indian Motor Vehicles Acts, from 1914-2016 
The "Indian Motor Vehicles Act, 1914" was amended by the "Indian Motor Vehicles (Amendment) Act, 1920" (Act No. XXVII of 1920) passed by the Imperial Legislative Council. It received assent from the Governor General of India on 2 September 1920. The Act amended sections 11 and 18 of the 1914 Act.

The Act was amended again by the "Indian Motor Vehicles (Amendment) Act, 1924" (Act No. XV of 1924). The Act received assent from the Governor General on 18 September 1924. It had the title, "An Act further to amend the Indian Motor Vehicles Act, 1914, for certain purposes" and amended section 11 of the 1914 Act by inserting the words "and the duration for which" after the words "area in which" in clause (a) of subsection (2) of section 11. The motor vehicles act has again been amended in 1939, and replaced in 1988. The 1988 amendment was brought to address above mentioned statements of object and reasons.

The Road Transport And Safety Bill Movement
The Road Transport and Safety Bill, 2014 envisioned providing a framework for safer, faster, cost-effective and inclusive movement of passengers and freight in India, thus enabling the mission of 'Make In India' following the death of the union minister Gopinath Munde in 2014.

The bill proposed to set up the Motor Vehicle Regulation & Road Safety Authority of India, an independent agency for vehicle regulation and road safety which would be legally empowered and accountable to Parliament.

Later due to controversies listed down in the controversies section, The bill was subsequently replaced by the Motor Vehicles (Amendment) Bill, 2017.

Indian Motor Vehicles (Amendment) bill, 2017 
This will be a significant upgrade to the motor vehicle laws. It envisages body cams on traffic cops and RTO officials to check corruption and 7-year imprisonment instead of current 2 years for drink-driving deaths, mandatory 3rd party insurance for all vehicles, and stiffer penalties for traffic violations to reduce the accident rates. The bill was passed by the Lok Sabha in April 2017 and sent to the Rajya Sabha, which referred it to a select committee in August 2017. The bill was again scrutinized by a joint standing committee composed of Transport ministers of 18 states of India.

Indian Motor Vehicles (Amendment) Act, 2019
This is similar to the Indian Motor Vehicles (Amendment) bill, 2017, although, introduced later in 2019 so the name. The earlier bill has lapsed at the end of the last session of 16th Lok Sabha. The bill was re-introduced in the first session of 17th Lok Sabha by union transport minister Nitin Gadkari which is then passed by both the houses before the end of the session.

Implementation of the Amended Law
As per the official notification issued by the central government on 28 August 2019, the 63 clauses of the Motor Vehicles (Amendment) Act,2019 to be implemented from 1 September 2019 as these clauses do not need any further modifications in the Central Motor Vehicles rules, 1989. These includes higher penalties for various traffic offences, national transportation policy among others.

Controversies 
Tamil Nadu Government opposed the Road Transport and Safety Bill and asked centre to redraft it as bill encroaches upon the financial, legislative and administrative powers of state governments. A nationwide strike was called by various transport unions on 30 April 2015 to protest against the bill.

West Bengal's transport ministry informed the state assembly on 27 August 2019 that the amended Motor Vehicles act will not be implemented in West Bengal since the state government is against the hefty fines proposed in the act.

References 

Modi administration
2019 in Indian law
Road transport in India
Transport legislation